The Portuguese Catholic Diocese of Viana do Castelo, in the Norte Region, has existed since 1977. It is a suffragan of the archdiocese of Braga, with its see at Viana do Castelo.

The current bishop is João Evangelista Pimentel Lavrador.

Notes

Viana
Viana do Castelo, Roman Catholic Diocese of
Viana do Castelo